Bolton Hollow is a valley in Washington County in the U.S. state of Missouri.

Bolton Hollow has the name of a pioneer prospector.

References

Valleys of Washington County, Missouri
Valleys of Missouri